The men's team épée was one of eight fencing events on the fencing at the 1984 Summer Olympics programme. It was the seventeenth appearance of the event. The competition was held from August 10 to 11 1984. 75 fencers from 16 nations competed.

Rosters

Argentina
 Csaba Gaspar
 Sergio Luchetti
 Marcelo Magnasco
 Sergio Turiace

Canada
 Jacques Cardyn
 Jean-Marc Chouinard
 Alain Côté
 Michel Dessureault
 Daniel Perreault

China
 Cui Yining
 Pang Jin
 Zhao Zhizhong
 Zong Xiangqing

Egypt
 Ihab Aly
 Ahmed Diab
 Abdel Monem Salem
 Khaled Soliman

France
 Philippe Boisse
 Jean-Michel Henry
 Olivier Lenglet
 Philippe Riboud
 Michel Salesse

Great Britain
 Ralph Johnson
 John Llewellyn
 Neal Mallett
 Steven Paul
 Jonathan Stanbury

Hong Kong
 Denis Cunningham
 Lai Yee Lap
 Lam Tak Chuen
 Liu Chi On

Italy
 Stefano Bellone
 Sandro Cuomo
 Cosimo Ferro
 Roberto Manzi
 Angelo Mazzoni

Kuwait
 Osama Al-Khurafi
 Abdul Nasser Al-Sayegh
 Ali Hasan
 Kazem Hasan
 Mohamed Al-Thuwani

Norway
 Paal Frisvold
 Nils Koppang
 John Hugo Pedersen
 Ivar Schjøtt
 Bård Vonen

Saudi Arabia
 Mohamed Ahmed Abu Ali
 Rashid Fahd Al-Rasheed
 Jamil Mohamed Bubashit
 Nassar Al-Dosari

South Korea
 Kim Bong-Man
 Kim Seong-Mun
 Lee Il-Hui
 Min Gyeong-Seung
 Yun Nam-jin

Sweden
 Jerri Bergström
 Greger Forslöw
 Kent Hjerpe
 Jonas Rosén
 Björne Väggö

Switzerland
 Olivier Carrard
 Daniel Giger
 Gabriel Nigon
 Michel Poffet
 François Suchanecki

United States
 Robert Marx
 John Moreau
 Peter Schifrin
 Lee Shelley
 Stephen Trevor

West Germany
 Elmar Borrmann
 Volker Fischer
 Gerhard Heer
 Rafael Nickel
 Alexander Pusch

Results

Round 1

Round 1 Pool A 

In the first set of matches, France beat Saudi Arabia 9–0 and China defeated the United States 9–4. The second set saw the winners both win or tie again (securing advancement) and the losers both lose or tie again (resulting in elimination), as France drew against the United States 8–8 (tied 59–59 on touches) and China won against Saudi Arabia 9–0. Finally, France took the top spot in the group by beating China 9–1 while Saudi Arabia finished last after losing to the United States 8–5.

Round 1 Pool B 

In the first set of matches, West Germany beat Hong Kong 9–1 and Great Britain defeated Norway 9–2. The second set saw the winners both win again (securing advancement) and the losers both lose again (resulting in elimination), as West Germany prevailed against Norway 9–2 and Great Britain won against Hong Kong 9–0. Finally, West Germany took the top spot in the group by beating Great Britain 9–3 while Hong Kong finished last after losing to Norway 9–2.

Round 1 Pool C 

In the first set of matches, Italy beat Argentina 9–1 and Canada defeated Egypt 8–0 (with 2 double-losses). The second set saw the winners both win again (securing advancement) and the losers both lose again (resulting in elimination), as Italy prevailed against Egypt 9–0 and Canada won against Argentina 8–3 (2 double losses). Finally, Italy took the top spot in the group by beating Canada 9–5 while Argentina finished last after losing to Egypt 9–4.

Round 1 Pool D 

In the first set of matches, Switzerland beat Kuwait 9–3 and South Korea defeated Sweden 7–3 (with 3 double-losses). The second set saw Sweden beat Switzerland 8–4 (2 double-losses) and South Korea prevail against Kuwait 9–1. In the final set, Switzerland defeated South Korea 9–5; this margin put both teams at 2–1 but South Korea led in bouts (21–16 vs. 18–18) and thus secured advancement; Kuwait was also eliminated at 0–2 before its match with Sweden. The match between Sweden and Kuwait would determine whether Sweden or Switzerland advanced; Sweden had already lost 16 bouts going into the match, so (to stay ahead of Switzerland on the first tie-breaker, bouts lost) could lose no more than 2 bouts against Kuwait to advance. Sweden won 9–2, matching Switzerland on bouts lost (18 to 18) but advancing on the second tie-breaker, bouts won (20 to 18).

Elimination rounds

References

Epee team
Men's events at the 1984 Summer Olympics